The Meeting Place (TMP) is an evangelical Mennonite church located in downtown Winnipeg, Manitoba. It is a member of the Canadian Conference of Mennonite Brethren Churches and the Mennonite Brethren Church of Manitoba. The Meeting Place's mission statement is "to be a biblically-functioning community leading people to become fully devoted followers of Jesus Christ."

History

The Meeting Place was founded in 1991 by a small group of former attendees of Portage Avenue Mennonite Brethren Church, as well as a few people from other church backgrounds. The hope was to create a new church with a focus on making a Sunday morning worship experience more comfortable for first-time visitors and offering them identifiable steps and pathways toward greater spiritual growth.

The Meeting Place was originally located in a small office building on Maryland Street prior to moving in 1993 to its current location on Smith Street in what was previously a night club. Church services were held in a temporarily renovated area in the Smith Street building basement while major renovations took place in the soon to be main auditorium. Once the main auditorium began being used for the weekend services, the basement was renovated to accommodate the Children's Ministry program. Subsequent renovations on the top floor have allowed for a theater to be built to accommodate the Youth Ministry programs.  In addition, staff offices have been moved around a number of times. Initially these were in the Smith Street building when it was first acquired by the congregation, but were taken out and moved to an office building one block away on Broadway Ave and remained there for a couple of years until once again being relocated to a basement office on Smith Street next door to the main auditorium building.

Over the years, The Meeting Place has seen both increases and declines in attendance.  At its peak in the late 90s and into 2000, over 2200 attendees were attending on a weekly basis.  Currently, 800 or more people attend on a weekly basis, with as many as 1500 people indicating they would call The Meeting Place their home faith community.

The Meeting Place has seen its share of Christian recording artists on staff, most notably Juno Award nominee and Covenant Award winner Jon Buller, and Covenant Award winner Drew Brown.  The Meeting Place is also where Christian recording artist and Juno Award winner Amanda Falk was discovered.

In September 2008, John Neufeld became the lead pastor The Meeting Place. He had previously been the head of the Canadian Conference of Mennonite Brethren Churches' Leadership Development department  John Neufeld served as the lead pastor for twelve and half years alongside a leadership team and executive pastor Bob Marsch. In May 2021, John resigned as lead pastor and transitioned to another pastoral role.

References

External links
 
 The Meeting Place Teaching Podcast- Listen to Sunday morning teachings online.
 Photo album of The Meeting Place Church's early days

Churches in Winnipeg
Downtown Winnipeg
Mennonite Brethren Church
Mennonite church buildings in Canada
Mennonitism in Manitoba